The Fred Price Bungalow, or Fred Price House, at 125 N. 1st West in Paris, Idaho was built in 1910. It was listed on the National Register of Historic Places in 1983.

It includes aspects of Colonial Revival style.

It is a -story gable-fronted house, with a hip-roofed porch crossing its facade.  The porch has square corner posts and thinner posts "inset a few feet", and a wrought-iron balustrade.  Its lower story is shiplapped; above is a clapboard band and above that is an "apron" covered with fishscale-patterned shingles, and a horizontal wooden siding area with narrow vertical strips.

References

National Register of Historic Places in Bear Lake County, Idaho
Colonial Revival architecture in Idaho
Buildings and structures completed in 1910